Ikaw Lang ang Mamahalin (International title: Only You / ) is a Philippine television drama romance series broadcast by GMA Network. Directed by Louie Ignacio, it stars Angelika dela Cruz. It premiered on March 26, 2001. The series concluded on November 1, 2002 with a total of 425 episodes. It was replaced by Habang Kapiling Ka in its timeslot.

A remake aired in 2011.

Cast and characters
Lead cast
 Angelika dela Cruz as Katherine Morales/Mylene Fuentebella/Carmencita San Diego

Supporting cast
 Sunshine Dizon as Clarissa delos Santos/Clarissa Fuentebella
 Dina Bonnevie as Martina Buenaventura
 Albert Martinez as Ferdinand Fuentebella
 Gina Alajar as Lilian delos Santos
 Cogie Domingo as Jepoy San Pedro
 James Blanco as Joseph Marcelo
 Eddie Gutierrez as Tony Madrigal
 Alicia Alonzo as Meding Morales
 Chanda Romero as Amarra Luna Fuentebella
 Carmi Martin as Beatrice Madrigal
 Janice Jurado as Mamu Lambana
 Sherwin Ordonez as Charles Madrigal
 Gabby Eigenmann as Marc Fuentebella
 Marjorie Barretto as Vanessa Fuentebella
 Ana Capri as Gina Reyes
 K Brosas as Flor
 Mel Martinez as Finky 
 Isabella de Leon as Ninay San Pedro
 Mia Gutierrez as Bebang San Pedro

Recurring cast
 LJ Moreno as Cassandra Fuentebella
 Chynna Ortaleza as Melanie Fuentebella
 Richard Gutierrez as Iñigo Zeñorosa
 Jaime Fabregas as Roberto Zeñorosa
 Russel Simon as Doctor Ruel 
 Rita Avila as Corrine Martinez
 Bojo Molina as Maui Marcelo
 Mark Anthony Fernandez as Gabriel/Lorenzo
 Raven Villanueva as Yolanda/fake Mylene
 Mystica as Vera
 Geneva Cruz as Melody
 Patricia Javier as Aravella
 Danica Sotto as Agatha Narciso
 Jennifer Sevilla as Diana
 Charlie Davao as Don Joaquin Narciso
 Ian Veneracion as Paolo
 Paolo Ballesteros as Paul
 Gerard Pizzaras as Bato

Guest cast
 Veka Lopez as young Katherine Morales
 Empress Schuck as young Clarissa
 Gary Estrada as Red Peralta
 Zoren Legaspi as Pilot Perez
 Tanya Garcia as Jessica
 Toni Gonzaga as Maya
 Trina Zuñiga as Marga
 Gary Valenciano as Ricky Lopez
 Michael de Mesa as Elmo
 Mark Gil as Miguel
 Glaiza de Castro as Marga's friend
 Tricia Roman as Enok
 Bembol Roco as Ruben
 Beverly Salviejo as Loleng
 Marky Lopez as Mike
 Rez Cortez as Basil
 Maureen Mauricio as Caring
 Kenji Marquez as Jake
 Robin da Rosa as Carlos
 Ruel Vernal as Badong
 Tom Olivar as Malvar
 Georgina Sandico as Gigi

References

External links
 

2001 Philippine television series debuts
2002 Philippine television series endings
Filipino-language television shows
GMA Network drama series
Philippine romance television series
Television shows set in Manila